Malviya Nagar is an region in south Jaipur, Rajasthan, and one of the constituencies of Jaipur District. It is close to Durgapura, Jawahar Nagar, Jagatpura and Sanganer. The region is named after the freedom fighter Madan Mohan Malviya.
Malviya Nagar is one of the poshest and upmarket locations of Jaipur. 
Malviya Nagar has the city's best restaurants, malls and many attractions.

Economy 
 Genpact BPO
 World Trade Park, Jaipur (baltared park)
 Malviya nagar riico

Notable sites 
 Jawahar Circle

Hospitals 
 Apex Hospital 
 Calgary Eye Hospital 
 Fortis Escorts
  EHCC Hospital
  apex hospital
  shree hospital

Transport 
Malviya Nagar is connected through the public transport system of minibus, low floor bus and by rikshaw. Also, the Jaipur International Airport Terminal 2 for domestic flights is within 5–10 minutes drive from most parts of the region.

Education

Schools 
 St. Anselm's Pink City Sr. Sec. School
 Jaipuriya Vidyalaya 
 Kendriya Vidyalaya
 St Edmunds school Malviya Nagar Jaipur
Government Girls school
 [ M.N.Morden public school

Colleges 
 Malviya National Institute of Technology
 BIT Mesra, Jaipur Campus
[Dr. B Lal institute of biotechnology]

References 

Neighbourhoods in Jaipur
Areas of Jaipur
Memorials to Madan Mohan Malaviya